Sudhakar Shamrao Deshmukh (born 11 October 1957) was a member of the 13th Maharashtra Legislative Assembly. He represented the Nagpur West Assembly Constituency. He belongs to the Bharatiya Janata Party (BJP) Deshmukh was also member of the 12th Assembly (2009–2014). 
Deshmukh was the president of Indian National Congress's (INC)  Nagpur district committee. Deshmukh, then with the Indian National Congress, was member of Maharashtra Legislative Council from 1991 to 1996. He joined the BJP in 2000 and was the president of BJP's Nagpur city unit in 2007. Deshmukh is a commerce graduate from Nagpur University.

Early life
Was active member of Indian National Congress. Then joined BJPin 2000.

Education and early career
Mr. Deshmukh is Commerce Graduate from Nagpur University.

Political career
MLA Nagpur West in 2009

Positions held

Within BJP

 Nagpur City President, BJP (2006)
State Vice President, BJP (2003)
 Ad-visor to Ex-President of Maharashtra BJPDevendra Fadnavis

Legislative

Member, Maharashtra Legislative Council - 1991-1996
Member, Maharashtra Legislative Assembly - 2 consecutive terms, since 2009

References

Maharashtra MLAs 2014–2019
Maharashtra MLAs 2009–2014
Members of the Maharashtra Legislative Council
Politicians from Nagpur
Marathi politicians
Indian National Congress politicians
1957 births
Living people
Bharatiya Janata Party politicians from Maharashtra